Marijke Breuning (born 1957) is an American political scientist specializing in foreign poilcy analysis (FPA) and a Professor of Political Science at the University of North Texas. She completed her PhD at the Ohio State University.

Breuning serves on editorial boards in the International Studies Association and American Political Science Association. She served as the book review editor of International Politics (2000-2003), co-editor of the Journal of Political Science Education (2005-2012), an editor of Foreign Policy Analysis (2005-2009),  and editor of the American Political Science Review (2012-2016). She is a contributor to SAGE Publications's 21st Century Political Science: A Reference Handbook (2011).

Publications 
How to Get Published in the Best Political Science and International Relations Journals: Understanding the Publishing Game (Edward Elgar Publishing, 2021), with John Ishiyama
21st Century Political Science: A Reference Handbook (SAGE Publications, 2010), with John Ishiyama
Foreign Policy Analysis: A Comparative Introduction (Palgrave Macmillan, 2007)
Introduction To Foreign Policy Analysis (Routledge, 1999)
Fundamentals of International Relations (1991)

Personal life 
Breuning and her husband adopted two daughters from Ethiopia.

References

Living people
American political scientists
University of North Texas faculty
Ohio State University alumni
1957 births